{{Speciesbox
| image = Solenostomus paradoxus black on pink.jpg
| status = LC
| status_system = IUCN3.1
| status_ref = 
| taxon = Solenostomus paradoxus| authority = (Pallas, 1770)
| synonyms = *Fistularia paradoxa Pallas, 1770 Solenostomatichthys paradoxus (Pallas, 1770) 
}}

The ornate ghost pipefish or harlequin ghost pipefish, Solenostomus paradoxus, is a false pipefish of the family Solenostomidae. The species name comes from the Greek paradoxos, referring to this fish's unusual external features. Ornate ghost pipefish are found in the Western Pacific and the Indian Ocean along reef edges prone to strong currents from the Red Sea to Tonga. They reach a maximum length of 12 cm. They vary in color from red or  yellow to black and are almost transparent. Although relatively common, ornate ghost pipefish are very well-camouflaged and difficult to find. It occurs either as solitary individuals or in pairs, among the branches of gorgonians, in floating weeds, or crinoids where the feed on mysids and small benthic shrimp.

The IUCN conservation status of Solenostomus paradoxus'' has been evaluated as "Least Concern".

References

External links
 

Solenostomus
Fish described in 1770
Taxa named by Peter Simon Pallas
Taxobox binomials not recognized by IUCN